Marshville Township, population 8,523, is one of nine townships in Union County, North Carolina. This township contains the towns of Wingate (east parts of) and Marshville within its borders.

Geography
The east part of the township is drained by Lanes Creek and its tributaries; Maness Branch, Lacey Branch, Wide Mouth Branch, Lick Branch, Beaverdam Creek, Barkers Branch, Cedar Branch, Cool Spring Branch, and Norkett Branch.  The northwestern and northern part of the township is drained by Richardson Creek and its tributaries; Bull Branch, Meadow Branch, and Salem Creek.

References

Townships in Union County, North Carolina
Townships in North Carolina